Donald's Off Day is a 1944 Walt Disney animated short by Jack Hannah starring Donald Duck and Huey, Louie and Dewey. It stars the nephews tricking Donald into thinking that he is seriously ill.

This cartoon was Hannah's debut as an animation director. Veteran animator Jack King was slated to direct the short, but Hannah argued that King wasn't up to it:

Plot
Donald wakes up one morning noticing that it is a sunny day outside he feels excited and prepares himself to go out to play golf as quickly as possible. However, as soon as he leaves his house, out of nowhere, a rainy thunderstorm comes crashing down the sky. Now in a bad mood, he acts rudely towards his nephews Huey, Dewey and Louie, who decide to play a trick on him. As Donald reads through a medical book to pass the time while it rains outside, the nephews manage to fool him into believing he actually is sick. As Donald is laid to rest on his couch, they sneak a little toy rabbit with an air pump underneath his blanket and start pumping air into it. Donald assumes it is his heart beating overtime and fears that he is about to die. Eventually he discovers he has been fooled all along and wants to punish Huey, Louie and Dewey, but then it stops raining and Donald is immediately overjoyed. He runs outside with his golf gear, only for the thunderstorm to return immediately, and Donald is struck by lightning.

Voice cast
 Clarence Nash as Donald Duck, Huey, Dewey and Louie
 Adriana Caselotti as Singer of opening song

Home media
The short was released on December 6, 2005, on Walt Disney Treasures: The Chronological Donald, Volume Two: 1942-1946.

References

External links
 

Donald Duck short films
1944 films
1940s Disney animated short films
1944 animated films
Films directed by Jack Hannah
Films produced by Walt Disney
Golf animation
Films scored by Paul Smith (film and television composer)
Films about hypochondriasis